Msimang is a surname. Notable people with the surname include:

 Agnes Msimang, awarded the Order of Luthuli in 2014
Aura Lewis, born Aurelia Msimang (1947–2015), South African singer
 Bernard Msimang, actor in Duma (2005 film)
Christian Msimang, South African politician, member of Inkatha Freedom Party
Fabian Msimang (born 1960), former Chief of the South African Air Force
 Gab Msimang, Co-ordinator of the South African intelligence services
 Hlubi Msimang, office administrator for Maritzburg United F.C.
H. Selby Msimang (1886–1982), South African leader and anti-apartheid activist
Mendi Msimang (1928–2018), African National Congress treasurer 1997–2012, husband of Manto Tshabalala-Msimang
Manto Tshabalala-Msimang, (1940–2009), South African politician, wife of Mendi Msimang
Mavuso Msimang, former ANC freedom fighter, founder of African Parks, father of Sisonke Msimang
Sibusiso Msimang, South African actor, in the 2016 film Vaya
Sisonke Msimang, South African/Australian writer and political analyst, daughter of Mavuso Msimang
 Professor Themba Christian Msimang, winner of Chairperson's Award in the South African Literary Awards in 2016
 Professor Themba Msimang, professor, member and then chair of the Heraldry Council in South Africa
 Vusi Msimang, actor in 2012 South African film Little One
 Walter Msimang, president of the Agricultural Food and Allied Democratic Workers Union as of 2020